Paul II may refer to:

 Paul the Black of Alexandria, Syriac Orthodox Patriarch of Antioch from  550 to 575
 Patriarch Paul II of Constantinople, Patriarch of Constantinople from 641 to 653
 Pope Paul II, Pope from 1464 to 1471
 Paul II Anton, Prince Esterházy in 1721–1762
 Paul II Cheikho, patriarch of the Chaldean Catholic Church in 1958–1989
 Paul II, Serbian Patriarch, Archbishop of Peć and Serbian Patriarch from 1990 to 2009

See also
 Patriarch Paul II (disambiguation)
 Gibson The Paul II, electric guitar
 Paul II (octopus), oracular octopus